The Torre Avalanz is a skyscraper building located in San Pedro Garza García, Nuevo León, Mexico. Its height is 548 ft., as the building has 43 floors, four are below ground, and 39 are above ground. It also has 17 apartments, 831 parking spaces, and 14 elevators.

History 
The idea for this building first originated in 1981, and the building was intended to be for computer and technology evolution. It was finally completed in 2000, 19 years later than originally planned. However, the purpose of the building was different than what was intended, as it became an apartment and office building. Torre Avalanz became the tallest building in the metropolitan area of Monterrey at the time of its construction, surpassing Torre Comercial America, which had held the title since 1994. Torre Avalanz was later surpassed in height by Torre Ciudadana, which was completed in 2010.

See also 

 List of tallest buildings in Monterrey

References 

Skyscraper office buildings in Mexico
Residential skyscrapers in Mexico
Buildings and structures in Nuevo León
Office buildings completed in 1981
1981 establishments in Mexico